Anthony Giles is a former Australian rules footballer who played with Port Adelaide in the South Australian National Football League (SANFL) during the late 1970s and early 1980s. 

Giles came to Port Adelaide from Yorketown and made his senior SANFL debut in 1975. He was used mostly as a half back flanker, playing in Port's 1979 and 1981 premiership teams. At interstate level Giles was a regular South Australia representative, playing eight games and earning All-Australian selection in 1983.

External links

Australian rules footballers from South Australia
Port Adelaide Football Club (SANFL) players
Port Adelaide Football Club players (all competitions)
All-Australians (1953–1988)
Living people
Year of birth missing (living people)
South Australian State of Origin players